St. Margaret's Church is a church located in the parish of Saint John, Barbados. It was built in 1862.

References 

Churches in Barbados
Saint John, Barbados